Parafodina inscripta is a moth of the family Erebidae first described by Arnold Pagenstecher in 1907. It is found in southwest Madagascar.

It has an expansion of 25 mm.

References

Calpinae
Moths of Madagascar
Moths of Africa